The Hughes 38-1 or Hughes 38 Mark I, is a Canadian sailboat that was designed by Sparkman & Stephens as a cruiser-racer and first built in 1967. It is Sparkman & Stephens design number 1903.

The design was originally marketed by the manufacturer as the Hughes 38, but is now usually referred to as the Hughes 38-1 or Mark I to differentiate it from the later 1970 Hughes 38-2 and 1977 Hughes 38-3 designs.

Production
The design was built by Hughes Boat Works in Canada, from 1967 until 1969, but it is now out of production.

Some hulls were also built by Hughes and sold to Hinckley Yachts of Southwest Harbor, Maine. These hulls were then fitted with a new deck design built by Hinckley and marketed as the Hinckley 38.

Design
The Hughes 38-1 is a recreational keelboat, built predominantly of fibreglass, with wood trim. It has a masthead sloop rig; a raked stem; a raised counter, reverse transom; a skeg-mounted rudder controlled by a tiller and a fixed fin keel. It displaces  and carries  of lead ballast.

The boat is fitted with a Universal Atomic 4 gasoline engine for docking and manoeuvring, although a diesel engine was available as a factory option.

The design has sleeping accommodation for seven people, with a double "V"-berth in the bow cabin, a straight settee and a drop-down dinette table that forms a double berth in the main cabin and two aft quarter berths. The galley is located on the starboard side just forward of the companionway ladder. The galley is equipped with a two-burner stove and a sink, plus an ice box under the companionway steps. A navigation station is opposite the galley, on the port side. The head is located just aft of the bow cabin on the port side and includes a shower.

For sailing the design may be equipped with one of a series of jibs or genoas.

See also
List of sailing boat types

References

Keelboats
1960s sailboat type designs
Sailing yachts
Sailboat type designs by Sparkman and Stephens
Sailboat types built by Hughes Boat Works